Juriaen Jacobsz or Georg Albert Jacobsz (December 17, 1624, Hamburg – 1685, Leeuwarden), was a Dutch Golden Age portrait and animal painter.
According to Houbraken he was a pupil of Frans Snyders in Antwerp and a teacher of Hendrik Carré in Leeuwarden. In Leeuwarden he became court painter to Henry Casimir II, Prince of Nassau-Dietz in Leeuwarden.
According to the Netherlands Institute for Art History, he was in Antwerp from 1652 to 1658, in Amsterdam from 1659 to 1664 and travelled to Leeuwarden in 1665, where he stayed. His pupils were Hendrik Carré and David Klöcker Ehrenstrahl.

References

1624 births
1685 deaths
Dutch Golden Age painters
Dutch male painters
Artists from Hamburg
People from Leeuwarden
Court painters